Laçin  is a small town in  Sarıcakaya district of  Eskişehir Province, Turkey. The population of Laçin was 596 as of 2012. The history of the settlement goes back to 16th century. The maim economic activities  of the town are agriculture, sheep and cattle breeding and lately poultry rising. The town is also known for mineral water sources around.

References 

Populated places in Eskişehir Province
Towns in Turkey
Sarıcakaya District